Selling, carrying, bringing, or taking coal(s) to Newcastle is an idiom of British origin describing a pointless action. It refers to the fact that, historically, the economy of Newcastle upon Tyne in north-eastern England was heavily dependent on the distribution and sale of coal and therefore any attempt to sell coal to Newcastle would be foolhardy as supply would be greater there than anywhere else in Britain.

History
The phrase "to carry coals to Newcastle" is first documented in North America in 1679 in William Fitzhugh's letters ("But relating farther to you would be carrying Coals to new Castle") and first appears in a printed title in Labour in Vain: Or Coals to Newcastle: A Sermon to the People of Queen-Hith, 1709. Thus, the expression predates the 1854 great fire of Newcastle and Gateshead by nearly two centuries and is not morbid humor in response to the fire.

In 1661–1662, John Graunt, in his work on the Bills of Mortality for London (published by the Royal Society 1665), uses the phrase in his introductory expression of gratitude to Lord John Roberts, the Lord Privy Seal: "...I should (according to our English Proverb) thereby carry Coals to Newcastle...", and suggests a much earlier provenance.

Timothy Dexter, an American entrepreneur, purportedly succeeded in defying the idiom in the 18th century by shipping coal to Newcastle. Renowned for his eccentricity and regarded as a buffoon, he was persuaded to sail a shipment of coal to Newcastle by rival merchants plotting to ruin him. He wrote that he instead got a large profit after his cargo arrived during a miners' strike which had crippled local production.

More prosaically, the American National Coal Association asserted that the United States profitably sold coal to Newcastle in the early 1990s, and 70,000 tonnes of low-sulphur coal was imported by Alcan from Russia in 2004 for their local aluminium smelting plant.

Although the coal industry of Newcastle upon Tyne is now practically non-existent, the expression can still be used today with a degree of literal accuracy, since the harbour of Newcastle in Australia (named for Newcastle in the UK after abundant coal deposits were discovered there and exploited by early European settlers) has succeeded its UK namesake by becoming the largest exporter of coal in the modern world.

Contemporary use
With the increasing onset of globalisation, parallels in other industries occur, and the idiom is now frequently used by the media when reporting business ventures whose success may initially appear just as unlikely. It has been referred to in coverage of the export to India of saffron from Saudi Arabia and chicken tikka masala from the United Kingdom, the sale of Scottish pizzas to Italy, and the production of manga versions of William Shakespeare from Cambridge for Japan.

Even though its original geographic origin may have been displaced, this cliché continues to be used.

See also
Sell ice to Eskimos
Owls to Athens
Bring owls to Athens
Pizza effect

References

Culture in Newcastle upon Tyne
British English idioms
History of Newcastle upon Tyne